Nototodarus sloanii is a species of squid commonly known as the New Zealand arrow squid or Wellington flying squid. It is also known by its Māori name of wheketere. It is a favoured prey species of a number of marine mammals and diving birds. It is an important food source for the New Zealand fur seal and two endangered species: the New Zealand sea lion and the yellow-eyed penguin (Megadyptes antipodes). N. sloanii is sought by trawler fishermen for human consumption; New Zealand sea lions are frequently caught in trawl nets and drowned when feeding on N. sloanii.

Habitat
The species inhabits the coastal regions and the continental shelf around New Zealand to a depth of about 500 m, at a broad range of temperatures but more inclined towards colder waters.

Description
The species exhibits a maximum mantle length of between 32 to 42 cm, and a maximum weight of  0.6 to 1.8 kg when they are fully grown. Growth rates are known to  increase with higher temperatures. They have an orange and pink muscular mantle that tapers to a pointed tail, with a darker maroon stripe down the midline, and has a sagittate (arrowhead) that is 42 to 48% of the mantle length. It also has broad fins angled 40-50 degrees and eight tentacles, mainly composed of the tentacular club, with sucker rings containing 11 to 13 conical teeth with low platelets; arm sucker rings with 11-15 short teeth surrounding a central one. They use these tentacles for catching prey. There are two  fins on the head of the squid that are used to siphon water in one side and push it out of the other. The mouth can be found in between the arms.

Lifecycle
The peak spawning season for N. sloanii is from September to March. However, spawning occurs throughout the year for this species. N. sloanii reproduce sexually; they have a mating ritual that can be behavioral, physical, and morphological. During this process, the male hold the female and insert their hectocotylus into the females' mantle cavity: this is also where the fertilization of the egg occurs. Spermatophores are usually found in the buccal cavities of the females, but sometimes the females are found with spermatophores affixed to the head, arms, or dorsal mantle. The male and female adults die shortly after spawning.  Embryos hatch at a planktonic stage until they grow into benthic adults that live for just over a year, and due to its high growth rate, it reaches maturity at around 200 days. The arrow squid has a short lifespan, rapid growth and development, and ability to have their appearance molded. Their population is made up of new individuals each year.

At the cellular level of the arrow squid, growth occurs over their entire lifespan by excessive growth and abnormal increase in the number of cells. Arrow squids have exceptionally high growth efficiency, with a protein-based metabolism that rapidly converts energy into growth. They store very little if any of their food energy. The metabolic and growth rates of squid are very high in fact they may be as high as some mammals.

N. sloanii displays high intraspecific variability in areas such as egg size and rates of embryonic development, hatchling size, growth, age and size at maturity. Their changing appearances along with their short lifespan and rapid growth rates allows the squid to be extremely responsive to changing environmental conditions. They are also able to move over considerable distances leading to them having unpredictable and complex patterns of distribution.

References

Cephalopods described in 1849
Cephalopods of Oceania
Endemic fauna of New Zealand
Endemic molluscs of New Zealand
Molluscs of New Zealand
Molluscs of the Pacific Ocean
sloanii
Taxa named by John Edward Gray